Geobalanus is a genus of flowering plants belonging to the family Chrysobalanaceae.

Its native range is Southeastern USA, Western Mexico to Central America.

Species:

Geobalanus oblongifolius 
Geobalanus retifolius 
Geobalanus riverae

References

Chrysobalanaceae
Chrysobalanaceae genera